The missile strike on dormitories in Kharkiv was performed by Russian aviation with a series of missiles in the evening of 17 August and in the morning of 18 August 2022. This became one of the largest attacks on Kharkiv and one of the most tragic nights of the city. The impact killed 25 people including an 11-year old boy. 44 were injured (including 3 children).

Background 

At the very beginning of the 2022 Russian invasion of Ukraine, Russian soldiers tried to capture the city, but failed; Kharkiv has been subjected to almost constant shelling by artillery shells and rockets since then.

Course of events 

On 17 August 2022, at 4:30 am, several rockets were fired from Belgorod on the Slobidskyi and Saltivskyi districts of Kharkiv. In the Slobidskyi District, a four-story hostel of a tram depot was hit together with adjacent repair workshop and neighboring non-living building.

The second missile attack was carried out at 21:30 and destroyed a three-story hostel in the Saltivskyi district, where people with hearing impairments lived. The missile attack caused a fire, and the building was completely destroyed.

Victims 
In the Slobidskyi district, on the day of the tragedy it was known that two people were killed and 18 were injured, including two children. Subsequently, the bodies of six people were excavated from under the ruins. Ten units of fire and rescue equipment worked at the scene of the shelling along with forty rescuers of the State Emergency Service.

In the Saltivskyi district, 19 people were killed and 22 injured, including an 11-year-old child.

Reactions

Ukraine
President of Ukraine Volodymyr Zelensky said: “When you hear about Kharkiv Saltivka, it’s pain again. Pain for all Ukraine. Pain for Kharkiv,” he wrote. “Rocket attack… On the hostel… The building is completely destroyed.” The President described the killing of residents as "a vile and cynical blow to civilians, which has no justification and demonstrates the impotence of the aggressor".

According to the head of the military administration of the Kharkiv region, Oleh Synyehubov: “The Russians brutally and purposefully attacked civilians. And now in their so-called "media" they are spreading another fake about "military facilities". There are no military installations. Exclusively civilian facilities, including pensioners and children. This is real terrorism, which only fiends are capable of!”.

Russia
The Russian Defense Ministry confirmed the missile attack on Kharkiv in its briefing. According to their version, “a high-precision ground-based weapon hit a temporary base for foreign mercenaries” and as a result, “more than 90 militants were destroyed”.

Mourning
On August 19, mourning was declared in Kharkiv in memory of those killed by Russian shelling.

References

External links 
 
 
 Ukraine: Unlawful Russian Attacks in Kharkiv, Human Rights Watch
 Missile Strike Kills 6 Civilians in Kharkiv, as Front Remains Static, New York Times

August 2022 events in Ukraine
2020s building bombings
21st-century mass murder in Ukraine
History of Kharkiv Oblast
Airstrikes during the 2022 Russian invasion of Ukraine
Attacks on buildings and structures in 2022
Attacks on buildings and structures in Ukraine
Building bombings in Europe
Mass murder in 2022
Russian war crimes in Ukraine
War crimes during the 2022 Russian invasion of Ukraine
July 2022 crimes in Europe
Airstrikes conducted by Russia